Caccinia is a genus of flowering plants belonging to the family Boraginaceae.

Its native range is Caucasus to Himalaya.

Species:

Caccinia actinobole 
Caccinia dubia 
Caccinia kotschyi 
Caccinia macranthera 
Caccinia strigosa

References

Boraginaceae
Boraginaceae genera